Piaya is a small genus of relatively large and long-tailed cuckoos, which occur in Mexico, Central America and South America. The two species in taxonomic order are:

The little cuckoo has been found to be closer to some species traditionally placed in Coccyzus or Micrococcyx. These are now again separated in Coccycua.

Description and ecology
These birds are birds with relatively slender bodies, long tails and strong legs. The black-bellied cuckoo is essentially restricted to rainforest, but the more widespread squirrel cuckoo also occurs in other forest types, woodlands or mangroves.
 
Piaya cuckoos, unlike many Old World species, are not brood parasites; they build their own nests in trees and lay two eggs. Parasitic cuckoos lay coloured eggs to match those of their passerine hosts, but the non-parasitic Piaya species, like most other non-passerines, lay white eggs.

These are vocal species with persistent and loud calls. They feed on large insects such as cicadas, wasps and caterpillars (including those with stinging hairs or spines which are distasteful to many birds). Squirrel and black-bellied cuckoos are large and powerful species, and occasionally take vertebrate prey such as small lizards.

References

 Stiles and Skutch,  A guide to the birds of Costa Rica  

 
Bird genera
 

Taxa named by René Lesson